"Nothing's Gonna Stop Us Now" is a song co-written by Diane Warren and Albert Hammond and recorded by American rock band Starship for their second studio album, No Protection (1987). It is a power ballad duet featuring vocalists Grace Slick and Mickey Thomas and is the theme to the romantic-comedy film Mannequin.

The song reached number one on the US Billboard Hot 100, Warren's first single to do so. Elsewhere, "Nothing's Gonna Stop Us Now" topped the charts in Canada, the Republic of Ireland and the United Kingdom, where it became the second-best-selling song of 1987. "Nothing's Gonna Stop Us Now" received a nomination for Best Original Song at the 60th Academy Awards.

Background
In a radio interview, Hammond said that the idea for the song came from his impending marriage to his live-in girlfriend of seven years after his divorce from his previous wife was finalized. He had said to Warren, "It's almost like they've stopped me from marrying this woman for seven years, and they haven't succeeded. They're not gonna stop me doing it." The song has been considered "feel good" propelled by a strong synthesizer beat.

Reception
Cash Box called the song "an emotional duet by  Thomas and Grace Slick" and "a blustery, expansive production."

Commercial performance
The song topped the Billboard Hot 100 on April 4, 1987. In the United Kingdom, the song peaked at the top of the UK Singles Chart for four weeks and became the UK's second-best-selling song of 1987 behind "Never Gonna Give You Up" by Rick Astley. The song also reached the top 10 in six other European countries. It became the first chart-topping song to be written by Warren. Grace Slick, at age 47, became the oldest woman to attain a number-one single in the United States, surpassed only by Cher, who was 52 when her song "Believe" reached number one in early 1999.

Music video
The music video for "Nothing's Gonna Stop Us Now" was released in 1987. It features Kim Cattrall and shows Mickey Thomas pursuing a mannequin who comes to life, played by Grace Slick, and is intercut with scenes from the film Mannequin. Meshach Taylor makes a cameo playing his role in the film as window dresser Hollywood Montrose, as does Narada Michael Walden, the producer of the song, who appears with the band.

Track listings
7-inch single
A. "Nothing's Gonna Stop Us Now" – 4:29
B. "Layin' It on the Line" (live at Stopher Gym, Nicholls State University) – 4:15

12-inch single
A1. "Nothing's Gonna Stop Us Now" – 4:29
A2. "Layin' It on the Line" – 4:15
B1. "We Built This City" (special club mix) – 7:00
B2. "Tomorrow Doesn't Matter Tonight" – 3:41

Personnel
 Mickey Thomas – vocals
 Grace Slick – vocals
 Donny Baldwin – drums, vocals
 Craig Chaquico – guitar (lead/solo only)
 Pete Sears – bass

Additional personnel
 Walter "Baby Love" Afanasieff – keyboards, synth bass
 Narada Michael Walden – drums
 Corrado Rustici – Charvel MIDI guitar
 Robert "Bongo Bob" Smith – drum sampling and percussion
 Karen "Kitty Beethoven" Brewington, Jim Gilstrap – background vocals

Charts

Weekly charts

Year-end charts

Certifications

See also
 List of Billboard Hot 100 number ones of 1987
 List of Hot Adult Contemporary number ones of 1987
 List of number-one singles of 1987 (Canada)
 List of number-one singles of 1987 (Ireland)
 List of UK Singles Chart number ones of the 1980s

Notes

References

1980s ballads
1986 songs
1987 singles
Albert Hammond songs
American soft rock songs
Billboard Hot 100 number-one singles
Cashbox number-one singles
Irish Singles Chart number-one singles
Love themes
Male–female vocal duets
Number-one singles in Portugal
RCA Records singles
Rock ballads
RPM Top Singles number-one singles
Song recordings produced by Narada Michael Walden
Songs about marriage
Songs written by Albert Hammond
Songs written by Diane Warren
Songs written for films
Starship (band) songs
UK Singles Chart number-one singles